Comparison of  Single-board microcontrollers excluding Single-board computers

See also 
Comparison of single-board computers

References

Further reading

External links 

Arduino
Computing comparisons
Microcontrollers